Brett Rainbow is an Australian former professional basketball player for the Melbourne Tigers in the Australian National Basketball League.

Brett is currently owner and founder of Tomorrow's Stars Basketball, a basketball training and coaching business.

Playing career
 1992-2000 Member of the Melbourne Tigers NBL Team.
 1993 Melbourne Tigers NBL Team, Winning the Championship.
 1995 Tour of America to play in warm up pre-season games against top college teams with Melbourne Tigers NBL Team.
 1995 Tour of Singapore winning the Merlion Cup Championship with the Melbourne Tigers NBL Team.
 1996 Melbourne Tigers NBL Team, Runners Up
 1996 Tour of America & Korea to play in warm up pre-season games against top colleges & the Korean National Team.
 1996-1997 Played as an import in the SBL Singapore's top Basketball League, resulting in winning the championship, ppg 28pts, 15rebs.
 1997 Melbourne Tigers NBL Team, Winning the Championship.
 1998 Melbourne Tigers NBL Team, Runners Up.
 2000-2007 Played in the ABA League with teams Werribee Devils, Ringwood Hawks, Melbourne Tigers playing over 150 games and scoring more than 5000 points.
 2002 Part of the Victorian Titans NBL Team Training Squad.
 2003-2004 Selected to participate and tour China with the Melbourne Tigers NBL team. As a result of the trip was chosen to join the Guangdong Tigers in China's top National Basketball League (CBA) as an import for 3 months. Resulting in a championship.
 2004 Tour of China with Melbourne Tigers NBL team for 2 weeks.
 2005 ABA All Star Team – Chosen to try out amongst 30 of top players in the ABA league. Selected as part of the team to travel to Cairns and attend the NBL pre-season tournament.
 2007 Tour of China with Melbourne Tigers NBL team for 2 weeks
 2014 - Played with the Pakenham Warriors ABA team, division 2

Coaching career
Head Coach/Basketball Operations for the following teams and schools:

 Xavier College
 Trinity Grammar
 Wesley College
 Christ Church Primary
 Geelong Grammar
 Fitzroy College
 Melbourne Girls Grammar
 Werribee Devils U/16 Rep Girls
 Bullen Boomers U/16 Boys
 Geelong Supercats U/16 Rep Boys

Special guest coach for over 250 teams

Career Highlights
 1993 Won NBL Championship with the Melbourne Tigers.
 1993 NBL Australian All-Star Slam Dunk Champion.
 1994 NBL Australian All-Star Slam Dunk Champion.
 1995 NBL Australian All-Star Slam Dunk Champion.
 1997 Won NBL Championship with the Melbourne Tigers.
 2004 First Australian player to be selected to play in China as a professional basketballer in China's elite basketball league, the CBA.
 2016- Invited to attend the NBA training center in China to conduct a week long private training clinic

References

1975 births
Living people
Australian men's basketball players
Melbourne Tigers players
Basketball players from Melbourne